Nitrogen trichloride, also known as trichloramine, is the chemical compound with the formula NCl3. This yellow, oily, pungent-smelling and explosive liquid is most commonly encountered as a byproduct of chemical reactions between ammonia-derivatives and chlorine (for example, in swimming pools). Alongside monochloramine and dichloramine, trichloramine is responsible for the distinctive 'chlorine smell' associated with swimming pools, where the compound is readily formed as a product from hypochlorous acid reacting with ammonia and other nitrogenous substances in the water, such as urea from urine.

Preparation and structure
The compound is prepared by treatment of ammonium salts, such as ammonium nitrate with chlorine.

Intermediates in this conversion include monochloramine and dichloramine, NH2Cl and NHCl2, respectively.

Like ammonia, NCl3 is a pyramidal molecule. The N-Cl distances are 1.76 Å, and the Cl-N-Cl angles are 107°.

Reactions and uses
The chemistry of NCl3 has been well explored.  It is moderately polar with a dipole moment of 0.6 D.  The nitrogen center is basic but much less so than ammonia.  It is hydrolyzed by hot water to release ammonia and hypochlorous acid.

NCl3 + 3 H2O → NH3 + 3 HOCl

NCl3 explodes to give N2 and chlorine gas.  This reaction is inhibited for dilute gases.

Nitrogen trichloride can form in small amounts when public water supplies are disinfected with monochloramine, and in swimming pools by disinfecting chlorine reacting with urea in urine and sweat from bathers.

Nitrogen trichloride, trademarked as Agene, was at one time used to bleach flour, but this practice was banned in the United States in 1949 due to safety concerns.

Safety
Nitrogen trichloride can irritate mucous membranes—it is a lachrymatory agent, but has never been used as such. The pure substance (rarely encountered) is a dangerous explosive, being sensitive to light, heat, even moderate shock, and organic compounds. Pierre Louis Dulong first prepared it in 1812, and lost two fingers and an eye in two explosions. In 1813, an NCl3 explosion blinded Sir Humphry Davy temporarily, inducing him to hire Michael Faraday as a co-worker. They were both  injured in another NCl3 explosion shortly thereafter.

See also

List of food contamination incidents

References

Further reading

External links

 OSHA - Nitrogen trichloride
 Nitrogen Trichloride - Health References

Inorganic amines
Chlorides
Nitrogen halides
Inorganic chlorine compounds
Inorganic nitrogen compounds
Explosive chemicals
Nitrogen(III) compounds
Liquid explosives